Sarijalu (also Romanized as Sārījālū, Sārī Jāllū, and Sari Jaloo; also known as ‘Alīābād, Sārī Khān, and Sarykhan) is a village in Minjavan-e Sharqi Rural District, Minjavan District, Khoda Afarin County, East Azerbaijan Province, Iran. At the 2006 census, its population was 382, in 96 families.

References 

Populated places in Khoda Afarin County